Huaxi may refer to these places in China:

 Western China
 Huaxi District (花溪区), a district in Guiyang, Guizhou
 Huaxi Village (华西村), a village in Jiangyin, Jiangsu

Subdistricts
Huaxi Subdistrict, Chongqing (花溪街道), in Banan District, Chongqing
Huaxi Subdistrict, Anshun (华西街道), in Xixiu District, Anshun, Guizhou
Huaxi Subdistrict, Huanghua (骅西街道), in Huanghua, Hebei

Towns
 Huaxi, Shaanxi (华西), in Huayin, Shaanxi
 Huaxi, Hongya County (花溪), in Hongya County, Sichuan
 Huaxi, Yunnan (华溪), in Yuxi, Yunnan

Townships
Huaxi Yi and Miao Ethnic Township (花溪彝族苗族乡), in Qianxi County, Guizhou
Huaxi Township, Hubei (花西乡), in Xiaochang County, Hubei
Huaxi Township, Sichuan (花溪乡), in Bazhong, Sichuan